Voorderweert is a hamlet in Belgium in the province of Antwerp. Some towns that are near Voorderweert are Sas, Molenhoek, and Brans. An airport close to Voorderweert is Zoersel.

Populated places in Antwerp Province
Bornem